The women's high jump event at the 2007 European Athletics U23 Championships was held in Debrecen, Hungary, at Gyulai István Atlétikai Stadion on 12 and 14 July.

Medalists

Results

Final
14 July

†: Alena Ivanova ranked initially 4th (1.89m), but was disqualified later for infringement of IAAF doping rules.

Qualifications
12 July
Qualifying 1.85 or 12 best to the Final

Group A

Group B

†: Alena Ivanova initially reached the final (1.81m), but was disqualified later for infringement of IAAF doping rules.

Participation
According to an unofficial count, 21 athletes from 17 countries participated in the event.

 (1)
 (3)
 (1)
 (1)
 (1)
 (1)
 (1)
 (1)
 (2)
 (2)
 (1)
 (1)
 (1)
 (1)
 (1)
 (1)
 (1)

References

High jump
High jump at the European Athletics U23 Championships